Hanička "Hana" Brady (born Hana Bradyová; 16 May 1931 – 23 October 1944) was a Czechoslovak Jewish girl murdered in the gas chambers at German concentration camp at Auschwitz, located in the occupied territory of Poland, during the Holocaust. She is the subject of the 2002 non-fiction children's book Hana's Suitcase, written by Karen Levine.

Biography
Hana Brady was born on 16 May 1931 in Prague, the daughter of Markéta (née Dubsky) and Karel Brady. Her family lived in Nové Město na Moravě in the Vysočina Region of Czechoslovakia. After the occupation of the whole of Czechoslovakia by Nazi Germany and the creation of the Protectorate of Bohemia and Moravia on 15 March 1939, the discriminatory Nuremberg laws began to be applied in this territory. Eight-year-old Hana and her older brother George (born Jiří Brady) watched their parents being arrested and taken away by the Nazis, and never saw them again. Hana and George were sent to the Theresienstadt concentration camp. In 1944, Hana was deported to the Auschwitz concentration camp. While her brother survived by working as a labourer, Hana was sent to the gas chambers a few hours after her arrival on 23 October 1944, her body was cremated with other victims in the ovens at the crematorium.

Hana's Suitcase

The story of Hana Brady first became public when Fumiko Ishioka (石岡史子, Ishioka Fumiko), a Japanese educator and director of the Japanese non-profit Tokyo Holocaust Education Resource Center, exhibited Hana's suitcase in 2000 as a relic of the concentration camp. Visiting Auschwitz in 1999, Ishioka requested a loan of children's items, things that would convey the story of the Holocaust to other children.

The suitcase turned out to be a very capable means of telling the story of the Holocaust, reaching out to children at their level.

The suitcase has large writing on it, a name and birthdate and the German word, Waisenkind (orphan). Ishioka began painstakingly researching Hana's life and eventually found her surviving brother in Canada. The story of Hana Brady and how her suitcase led Ishioka to Toronto became the subject of a CBC documentary. Karen M. Levine (born 1955), the producer of that documentary, was urged to turn the story into a book by a friend who was a publisher and whose parents were Holocaust survivors. Said Levine:

In February 2004, Lara Brady, Hana's niece, discovered inconsistencies between the suitcase on display and the suitcase pictured with Hana's friend after the war in the 1960s. Not only did the physical suitcase appear newer than in the photographs, but the location of the handle was also reversed. In March, Fumiko and George Brady inquired about the suitcase with the director of the Auschwitz museum, who explained that a replica had been created based on the pictures after the original suitcase was destroyed in a fire in 1984, while on loan to an English exhibit  in Birmingham. This fire was likely caused by arson (according to the director and police at the time.).

As the museum personnel had omitted this fact when they loaned it to the Tokyo Holocaust Education Resource Center, the fact that the suitcase was a replica had gone unnoticed for several years. The family and the Center assert that even as such, the replica's contribution to the cause of human rights and peace education is not lessened by its lack of authenticity.

Awards and recognition
The 2002 book became a bestseller and received the Bank Street College of Education Flora Stieglitz Straus Award for non-fiction, the National Jewish Book Award, and several other Canadian awards for children's literature. The book received a nomination for the Governor General's Award and was selected as a final award candidate for the Norma Fleck award. It has been translated into over 20 languages and published around the world. In October 2006, the book won the Yad Vashem award, presented to George Brady at a ceremony in Jerusalem.

Adaptations
A play based on the book was written by Emil Sher. A film, Inside Hana's Suitcase, appeared in 2009. The suitcase featured in the CBC documentary was not the original, but a replica. The real suitcase, on loan, was destroyed by neo-Nazi arsonists, who set fire to a warehouse in Birmingham, England, in 1984. The audiobook is available on certain websites. In 2011, a Hebrew version of the play was staged by the Nephesh Theater in Holon, Israel.

See also
 List of posthumous publications of Holocaust victims
 List of Holocaust diarists
Anne Frank
Yad Vashem
Anti-Semitism
Petr Ginz

References

External links
Family website
Radio Praha
Tokyo Holocaust Education Resource Center 
Suitcase tells Holocaust story at www.enquirer.com
  – largely Hana's Suitcase in English, in translation, in adaptation

1931 births
1944 deaths
Jewish children who died in the Holocaust
Czechoslovak civilians killed in World War II
Czech people who died in Auschwitz concentration camp
Children who died in Nazi concentration camps
Czech children
Theresienstadt Ghetto prisoners
People from Nové Město na Moravě
People killed by gas chamber by Nazi Germany
Czech Jews who died in the Holocaust
Refugees and displaced people in fiction